Early's raids in Pennsylvania were a series of June military actions before the 1863 Battle of Gettysburg in which the Confederate forces of Major General Jubal Early conducted raids and military engagements from Chambersburg through Gettysburg to York.

References

Battles of the Gettysburg campaign
Battles in Pennsylvania
1863 in Pennsylvania
June 1863 events